In sequence design, a Feedback with Carry Shift Register (or FCSR) is the arithmetic or with carry analog of a linear-feedback shift register (LFSR). The state change operation is determined by a set of coefficients  and is defined as follows: compute .

FCSRs have been used in the design of stream ciphers (such as the F-FCSR generator), in the cryptanalysis of the summation combiner stream cipher (the reason Goresky and Klapper invented them), and in generating pseudorandom numbers for quasi-Monte Carlo (under the name Multiply With Carry (MWC) generator - invented by Couture and L'Ecuyer,) generalizing work of Marsaglia and Zaman.

FCSRs are analyzed using number theory. Associated with the FCSR is a connection integer . Associated with the output sequence is the N-adic number  The fundamental theorem of FCSRs says that there is an integer  so that , a rational number. It is possible to express u as a simple quadratic polynomial involving the initial state and the qi.

In this case the output sequence is called an l-sequence (for "long sequence").

l-sequences have many excellent statistical properties that make them candidates for use in applications, including near uniform distribution of sub-blocks, ideal arithmetic autocorrelations, and the arithmetic shift and add property.  They are the with-carry analog of m-sequences or maximum length sequences.

There are efficient algorithms for FCSR synthesis. This is the problem: given a prefix of a sequence, construct a minimal length FCSR that outputs the sequence. This can be solved with a variant of Mahler and De Weger's lattice based analysis of N-adic numbers when ; by a variant of the Euclidean algorithm when  is prime; and in general by Xu's adaptation of the Berlekamp-Massey algorithm. It follows that, as with LFSRs and linear complexity, any stream cipher whose N-adic complexity is low should not be used for cryptography.

A general reference on the subject of LFSRs, FCSRs, and AFSRs is the book.

References

Stream ciphers
Digital registers
Cryptographic algorithms
Pseudorandom number generators